Thadou (Thado, Thaadou, Thado-Pao, Thadou-Kuki) is a Sino-Tibetan language of the Northern Kuki-Chin-Mizo linguistic sub branch. It is spoken in the northeastern part of India (specifically in Manipur and Assam). It is spoken by the Thadou people. The Thadou language is known by many names, including Thado, Thado-Pao, Thādo, Thadou-kuki, Thado-Ubiphei, Chin and Thādo-pao. There are several dialects of this language : Hangshing, Khongsai, Kipgen, Saimar, Langiung, Sairang, Thangngeo, Haokip, Sitlhou, Singson (Shingsol). The Saimar dialect was reported in the Indian press in 2012 to be spoken by only four people in one village in the state of Tripura. The variety spoken in Manipur has partial mutual intelligibility with the other Mizo-Kuki-Chin languages varieties of the area including Paite, Hmar, Vaiphei, Simte, Kom and Gangte languages.

Geographical distribution  

Thadou is spoken in the following locations (Ethnologue).

Northeast India
Manipur
Chandel district
Churachandpur district
Senapati district
Kangpokpi district
Tengnoupal district
Pherzawl district
Assam
Karbi Anglong (Mikil Hills)
NC hills (Dima Hasoa)

Dialects
Ethnologue lists the following dialects of Thadou, the names of which mostly correspond to clan names. There is high mutual intelligibility among dialects.

Lupho
Lupheng
Misao
Hangsing
Chongloi
Khongsai
Kipgen
Langiung
Sairang
Thangngeo
Haokip
Sitlhou
Touthang
Haolai
Singson (Shingsol)
Hanghal
Lhouvum
Mate
Lhungdim
Baite

Phonology

Consonants 

 /p t k/ are heard unreleased as [p̚ t̚ k̚] in word-final position.
  is heard as more apical  when occurring before front and central vowels.
  can have a cognate of an aspirated velar plosive  in the dialect spoken in Burma.

Vowels

Comparison between Thadou Dialects 
The Saimar dialect is only spoken by 4 people in one village, which is located in Tripura.

References

Further reading

Did you know Thado Chin is severely endangered? (n.d.). Retrieved 10 March 2017, from http://www.endangeredlanguages.com/lang/5702
Haokip, P. (2011). Linguistics of the Tibeto-Burman Area. THE LANGUAGES OF MANIPUR: A CASE STUDY OF THE KUKI-CHIN-MIZO LANGUAGES*, 34.1 (April), 85-118. Retrieved 9 March 2017, from https://dx.doi.org/10.15144/LTBA-34.1.85
History. (n.d.). Retrieved 9 March 2017, from http://thethadou.webs.com/history.htm
MultiTree: A Digital Library of Language RelationshipsMultiTree: A Digital Library of Language Relationships. (n.d.). Retrieved 8 March 2017, from http://multitree.org/codes/tcz.html
"Thadou." Encyclopedia of World Cultures. . Retrieved 3 May 2017 from Encyclopedia.com: http://www.encyclopedia.com/humanities/encyclopedias-almanacs-transcripts-and-maps/thadou
Thado Chin. (n.d.). Retrieved 10 March 2017, from http://glottolog.org/resource/languoid/id/thad1238
Thado Chin Rosary Prayers. (n.d.). Retrieved 7 March 2017, from http://www.marysrosaries.com/Chin_Thado_prayers.html
Thadou Kuki language. (n.d.). Retrieved 10 March 2017, from https://globalrecordings.net/en/language/759
The Thadou (or Thado). (n.d.). Retrieved 9 March 2017, from http://www.myanmarburma.com/attraction/174/the-thadou-or-thado
Where on earth do they speak Chin, Thado? (n.d.). Retrieved 10 March 2017, from http://www.verbix.com/maps/language/ChinThado.html
St George International Ltd. (n.d.). Retrieved 4 May 2017, from http://www.stgeorges.co.uk/blog/learn-english/how-many-people-in-the-world-speak-english

Languages of Manipur
Languages of Tripura
Endangered languages of India